Black Magic is a 1972 soul album released by Martha Reeves and the Vandellas on the Gordy (Motown) label. It is the last studio album issued by the group after ten years with the label. The album is significant for featuring the group's biggest hit of the decade with the Jackson 5-esque "Bless You". The track returned the Vandellas to chart success briefly in the US reaching number fifty-three pop, number twenty-nine R&B and reaching number thirty-three on the UK pop singles chart. It was also a top twenty hit in Canada reaching number sixteen on the chart, and a top ten single in Puerto Rico, where it reached the number two position. Two other subsequent singles, "In and Out of My Life" and "Tear It on Down", were the trio's last Billboard charted hits reaching the top 40 on the R&B charts. "No One There" was released in the UK as a solo single for Reeves .  The album has become a cult classic amongst the group's hard core fans.

After this album, the trio later disbanded that December ending the group's ten-year tenure together. Martha Reeves recalls many of the tracks on the album were originally assigned to Diana Ross before being reassigned to the group.

Track listing

Personnel
Martha Reeves - lead vocals
The Andantes - background vocals
Lois Reeves - background vocals
Sandra Tilley - background vocals
Valerie Simpson - background vocals
Nickolas Ashford - background vocals
The Blackberries - background vocals
The Funk Brothers - instrumentation
 Various LA musicians - instrumentation
Album coordination by Harry Balk
Produced by Johnny Bristol (tracks 1 & 6), The Corporation (tracks 2, 7, 8 & 10), Henry Cosby (track 3), Jimmy Roach (track 4), Ashford & Simpson (track 5), and George Gordy & Lawrence Brown (tracks 9 & 11).
Art direction by Curtis McNair
Graphic supervision by Tom Schlesinger
Photography by Raffaelli

References

1972 albums
Motown albums
Martha and the Vandellas albums
Albums produced by Ashford & Simpson
Gordy Records albums
Albums produced by the Corporation (record production team)
Albums produced by Johnny Bristol
Albums produced by Henry Cosby